Shelby Rogers and Coco Vandeweghe were the defending champions, but chose not to participate.

Yang Zhaoxuan and Zhang Kailin won the title, defeating Asia Muhammad and Maria Sanchez in the final, 7–6(7–1), 6–1.

Seeds

Draw

References 
 Draw

Aegon Eastbourne Trophy - Doubles
Aegon Eastbourne Trophy